Luka Kovačević (born 1 June 1992 in Rijeka) is a Croatian handballer, who plays as right back for Swiss club Emmen.

Career
Kovačević has been playing for Zamet since 2008 in Croatian Premier League the highest rank in Croatian handball.

In 2011 he played for Croatia U-21 team in the qualification phase for IHF Men's Junior World Championship which they failed to qualify for.

In 2012 Zamet came to the finals of the Croatian Cup but lost to Croatia Osiguranje Zagreb. Next season they played EHF Cup but lost in the first round to Meso Lovosica.

In 2016 Kovačević with Zamet entered Champion play-offs in the Croatian Premier League an achievement since Zamet's last play-offs were 10 years before in 2005/06 season.

Honours
RK Zamet
Croatian Cup Runner-up (1): 2012

References

External links
 Player Info

1992 births
Living people
Croatian male handball players
Handball players from Rijeka
RK Zamet players
Croatian expatriate sportspeople in Norway
Croatian expatriate sportspeople in Switzerland